Paul Hodson is an English hard rock singer, songwriter and musician.

Biography
Paul Hodson has been the keyboard player of the band Ten from 2001 until September 2011.

He has also played for the band Hard Rain since 1997 as well as for his solo project, named Hodson, under which he released his first (and only at the moment) album in 2004, named This Strange World. In 2003 he wrote (and played keyboards) for Bob Catley's solo album When Empires Burn.

He currently lectures at Staffordshire University, teaching music technology and offers students a balanced view of the music industry from his diverse tastes. Apart from being a songwriter and a keyboard player, he also produces music for other artists.

Paul Hodson is currently working on his second solo album, Faith Of The Crow, which is going to be released sometime during 2014.

Discography

Ten
Studio albums and EP's
 Far Beyond the World (2001)
 Return to Evermore (2004)
 The Essential Collection 1995-2005 (2005)
 The Twilight Chronicles (2006)
 Stormwarning (2011)

Hard Rain
Hard Rain (1997)
When The Good Times Come (1999)

Hodson
This Strange World (2004)With Vince O'Reagan and Lynch Radinsky

References

External links
Ten website

Living people
Year of birth missing (living people)
English male singers
English rock singers
English songwriters
Academics of Staffordshire University
Ten (band) members
British male songwriters
Hard Rain (band) members